Kenny Thompson (born 3 February 1956) is a Bermudian professional football manager.

Career
In 2003–2008 and since August until October 2010 he coached the Bermuda national football team.

References

External links
Profile at Soccerway.com
Profile at Soccerpunter.com

1956 births
Living people
Bermudian football managers
Bermuda national football team managers
Place of birth missing (living people)